The Angmering School is a coeducational community secondary school and sixth form located in Angmering, West Sussex that opened in 1975. The school has Specialist Sports and Science College status. The headteacher is Simon Liley. There are approximately 1400 children on roll, with an age range of 11 to 18 years. There is a Sixth Form college on the site which offers an array of Level 3 qualifications.

It has been awarded the Charter Mark.

The site is used by Worthing Hockey Club as their training ground.

Lavinia Norfolk Centre 
The Lavinia Norfolk Centre (LNC) is a Specialist Support Facility for students with any kind of impairment or disability at the school and is recognised nationally for the support it provides. The LNC has specialist staff who work in the centre and throughout the school.

The centre has various facilities including a hydrotherapy pool, a large physio and fitness suite with specialist equipment, separate classrooms, areas to store equipment, and a large central area for socialising and dining.

The whole school is accessible by wheelchair, with ramps, lifts and automatic doors providing ease of access.

In addition to money from the school budget, the LNC is funded by its own charitable trust, which helps to pay for maintenance, new equipment, activities for students, minibus repairs etc.

History 
The school first opened in 1975 to provide more secondary school places for the growing population in the area.

Many new buildings have been added to the school site since it first opened to accommodate increasing numbers of students and to provide more specialist classrooms for each subject. These additions include: a canteen, a music block (M block), a library and computer rooms (L block), a sixth form and languages block (C block), outdoor changing rooms, and outdoor sports areas, equipment and pitches.

2018/20 Renovations 
In 2018/20 the school underwent substantial renovations to improve and replace learning areas and equipment and to increase the capacity of the school.

F Block 
In October 2018, work started on the building of a new three storey block, to provide new classrooms and facilities for humanities, science and art. The building was completed in time to be used for the 2019/20 school year.

Other renovations 
Other work on the site included, the building of new drama and dance facilities, a larger car park, a new "superloo" toilet area, refurbishment of the existing science block (S block), refurbishment of the existing technology classrooms, moving of the main reception and admin offices, an extension to the outdoor changing rooms, and upgrades to some existing classrooms and facilities.

Facilities 
The school has use of a range of facilities, such as:

Sport/fitness 

 Two multi-use sports halls
 A full size astro-turf pitch with markings for various sports
 Indoor and outdoor cricket nets
 A long-jump sandpit
 A multi-use hardcourt area for tennis and netball
 An indoor climbing wall
 A hydrotherapy/swimming pool
 Indoor and outdoor changing rooms with showers

Seasonal 

 A running track
 A rugby pitch
 Two 11-a-side football pitches
 Various smaller football pitches
 various field sport markings

Drama/dance 

 Two sprung floor dance studios
 A drama studio
 Various shared practice rooms

Notable former pupils
 Prof Robert MacLaren FRCSE, FRCOphth, Professor of Ophthalmology since 2009 at the University of Oxford (Merton College)
 Liam Treadwell, jockey
 Sam Carter, Musician
Dino Lamb, professional rugby player for the Harlequins.

Headteachers
 1975-1987 Ron Moores
 1987-2002 Richard Evea 
 2002–2016 David Brixey
2016–present Simon Liley

References

External links
 School website
 Latest Ofsted report
 The School Data Dashboard
 School Performance Tables

Secondary schools in West Sussex
Educational institutions established in 1975
1975 establishments in England
Community schools in West Sussex